Alexis Tam Chon Weng (born July 1962) is the Secretary for Social Affairs and Culture of Macau, the fifth most senior government official in Macau.

Early life and education 
Tam was born in Myanmar on July 1962. He received a bachelor's degree in business administration from National Chengchi University and a bachelor's degree in law from China University of Political Science and Law. He also earned a master's degree in international business and entrepreneurship from the University of Glasgow along with a PhD in business Administration from Nankai University. Tam also has two higher education degrees in Portuguese language and culture from the Lisbon University Institute and human resource management and strategic management from the Catholic University of Portugal.

Career 

Tam was the Chief of Office of the Chief Executive Fernando Chui's Office during December 2009 to December 2014.

References
 Alexis Tam

1962 births
Living people
Macanese people
Government ministers of Macau
National Chengchi University alumni
China University of Political Science and Law alumni
Alumni of the University of Glasgow
Nankai University alumni
Catholic University of Portugal alumni
Place of birth missing (living people)